Faun & Games is the twenty-first book of the Xanth series by Piers Anthony.

Plot
A young faun discovers his friend has gone missing into the Void and thus, the tree that nymph is bound to will wither and die. The hero wishes to save his friend's tree but in doing so, he risks his own tree.  After visiting the Good Magician, Forrest Faun is sent with Mare Imbri to Ptero to find a faun for the tree.  His journey later takes him from Ptero to smaller moons that orbit that specific world's Ida.

Characters in Faun & Games
Forrest Fawn
Mare Imbrium
Eve
Dawn
Ida
Magician Humphrey

References

American fantasy novels
 21
1997 American novels
1997 fantasy novels
Tor Books books